Patou, formerly known as Jean Patou or Jean Patou Paris, is a French fashion house.

History 

The company was originally created by Jean Patou in 1914 and was eponymously named. After his premature death in 1936, his sister Madeleine and her husband Raymond Barbas continued running the business.

From 1919 the business designed and produced haute couture, ready-to-wear and perfume. In 1987, the haute couture activity was stopped. The same year, the Jean Patou house launched an accessories line, the artistic direction of which was entrusted to Peggy Huynh Kinh. By 1996 the company had closed.

Patou was acquired by Procter & Gamble in 2001. In 2011 it was bought by Designer Parfums Ltd, a UK-based firm. 

In September 2018, the LVMH group announced a strategic partnership with Designer Parfums Ltd, assimilating majority shares in the Jean Patou portfolio. As soon as the partnership was announced, LVMH relaunched the brand's couture activity, renamed "Patou", and appointed Guillaume Henry as artistic director.

References

External links 
 

French fashion
French companies established in 1914
LVMH brands